The 2017 Blancpain GT Series Asia was the inaugural season of SRO Motorsports Group and Team Asia One GT Management's Blancpain GT Series Asia, an auto racing series for grand tourer cars in Asia. The races were contested with GT3-spec and GT4-spec cars.

Calendar
On 19 October 2016, the Stéphane Ratel Organisation announced the 2017 calendar and championship details. The series started at Sepang on 8 April and ended at Zhejiang on 15 October, as the event at Zhejiang was moved forward one week, after the ruling Communist Party of China scheduled its 19th National Congress for the period.

Entry list

GT3

GT4

Race results
Bold indicates overall winner.

Championship standings
Scoring system
Championship points were awarded for the first ten positions in each race. Entries were required to complete 75% of the winning car's race distance in order to be classified and earn points. Individual drivers were required to participate for a minimum of 25 minutes in order to earn championship points in any race.

Drivers' championships

Overall

Notes
1 – Vutthikorn Inthraphuvasak and Yu Lin were guest drivers in Shanghai and therefore ineligible to score points.

Pro-Am

Notes
1 – Vutthikorn Inthraphuvasak was a guest driver in Shanghai and therefore ineligible to score Pro-Am class points.

Silver

Am-Am

Teams' championship

Notes
1 – Arrows Racing and FIST - Team AAI were guest teams in Shanghai and therefore ineligible to score points.

See also
2017 Blancpain GT Series
2017 Blancpain GT Series Endurance Cup
2017 Blancpain GT Series Sprint Cup

Notes

References

External links

Blancpain GT Series Asia
Blancpain GT Series Asia